Muhammad Syazwan bin Buhari  (born 22 September 1992) is a Singaporean footballer who plays as a goalkeeper for Singapore Premier League club Tampines Rovers and the Singapore national team.

Personal life
Syazwan's elder brother, Syarqawi Buhari, is a FIFA-certified referee who has officiated in the S.League for a number of years.

Club career

Young Lions

Syazwan began his professional football career with Garena Young Lions in the S. League in 2010.

Geylang International
In 2016, Syazwan signed for Geylang International and was the first choice goalkeeper for the club.

Tampines Rovers 
Following the conclusion of the 2017 S.League season, it was announced that Syazwan had signed for local giants Tampines Rovers on a 2-year contract. He is expected to take the place of departing No. 1 Izwan Mahbud, who had sealed a move to Thai League 2 side Nongbua.

Syazwan won his first trophy in the 2019 Singapore Cup when he played through the game with a dislocated finger.

Career statistics

Club

Honours 

Tampines Rovers
 Singapore Cup: 2019

International career

Youth
Syazwan was called up to the national Under-23 team for the 2015 Southeast Asian Games and was the first choice goalkeeper.

Senior
Due to his impressive performance in the S.League, he was called up for the first time by Singapore's head coach V. Sundramoorthy in 2016.

Others

Singapore Selection Squad
He was selected as part of the Singapore Selection squad for The Sultan of Selangor's Cup to be held on 24 August 2019.

References

1992 births
Living people
Singaporean footballers
Association football goalkeepers
Young Lions FC players
Geylang International FC players
Tampines Rovers FC players
Southeast Asian Games medalists in football
Southeast Asian Games bronze medalists for Singapore
Competitors at the 2013 Southeast Asian Games